is a subway station in Chūō, Tokyo, Japan, jointly operated by Tokyo Metro and Toei Subway. The station opened on June 8, 1988.

Lines 
Tsukishima Station is served by the following two lines.
Tokyo Metro Yūrakuchō Line
Toei Ōedo Line

Platforms

Tokyo Metro

Toei

History
The Tokyo Metro station opened on 8 June 1988. The Toei Oedo Line platforms opened on 12 December 2000.

See also

 List of railway stations in Japan

References

External links

 Tokyo Metro Tsukishima Station 
Toei Tsukishima Station